Steve Antony is a British children's author and illustrator, who has written and illustrated seventeen picture books and two board books.

Early life
Antony grew up in New Mexico, US, the son of a painter mother and blacksmith father.

He earned a master's degree in Children's Book Illustration from Anglia Ruskin University in 2013.

Career
Antony has written and illustrated eight books in the Mr Panda series, and four in The Queen series.

Publishers Weekly reviewed his book Unplugged, "digital-age parable avoids turning heavy-handed—his characters are so cheery, carefree, and congenial that readers will quickly forget that they're being taught a lesson." Kirkus Reviews wrote, "A gentle catalyst for crucial conversations about balancing digital diversions with real-life play as well as an introduction to self-guided critical thinking."

Antony has collaborated with Tim Minchin, illustrating his story When I Grow Up.

He won the Oscar's Book Prize in 2015, for his book The Queen's Hat. The award was presented by X Files actor Gillian Anderson. It was also shortlisted for the 2015 Waterstones Children's Book Prize.

Personal life
Antony lives in Swindon.

References

Living people
Alumni of Anglia Ruskin University
People from New Mexico
People from Swindon
British writers
British illustrators
Year of birth missing (living people)